The Bass Islands are three American islands in the western half of Lake Erie. They are north of Sandusky, Ohio, and south of Pelee Island, Ontario. South Bass Island is the largest of the islands, followed closely by North Bass Island and Middle Bass Island. They are located in Put-in-Bay Township, Ottawa County in the state of Ohio.  Historically Middle Bass has also been called Ile de Fleurs and North Bass was known as Isle St. George.

The Bass Island Archipelago includes the three Bass Islands, plus the Ohio islands of Ballast, Buckeye, Catawba, Gibraltar, Green, Kelleys, Lost Ballast, Mouse, Rattlesnake, Starve, and Sugar, and the Ontario islands of East Sister, Hen (including her three "chickens": Big Chicken, Chick, and Little Chicken), Middle, Middle Sister, North Harbour, and Pelee.

At their closest points, Middle Bass Island is approximately 0.5 mi (0.8 km) north of South Bass Island and North Bass Island is approximately 1.0 mi (1.6 km) north of Middle Bass Island. The border between Ohio and Ontario is approximately 1.0 mi (1.6 km) north of North Bass Island.

The village of Put-in-Bay on South Bass Island is a popular tourist stop during the summer. Perry's Victory and International Peace Memorial, commemorating the Battle of Lake Erie, is located on South Bass Island, near Put-In-Bay.  The island is also the annual host of the Inter-Lake Yachting Association regatta, known as Bay Week.

References

External links
 Lake Erie Islands State Park
 Middle Bass Island State Park
 Island Heritage - A Guided Tour to Lake Erie’s Bass Islands

Islands of Ottawa County, Ohio
Islands of Lake Erie in Ohio